I Met You in Naples (Italian: Io t'ho incontrata a Napoli) is a 1946 Italian musical melodrama film directed by Pietro Francisci and starring Anna Nievo, Leo Dale and Peppino De Filippo. The film takes its name from a popular song of the same title. It is part of the neorealist trend in post-Second World War Italian films.

An American soldier and a young Italian aspiring actress meet in wartime Naples in 1944. They fall in love and eventually marry. At the end of the film she emigrates to the United States with him, hoping to be able to pursue her career there.

Cast
Anna Nievo as Angela l'attrice
Leo Dale as ufficiale americano
Peppino De Filippo
Giuseppe Porelli
Claudio Gora
Paolo Stoppa
Lola Braccini
William Bye
Nino Pavese
Massimo Sallusti
Renzo Giovampietro

References

Bibliography 
 Cardullo, Bert. André Bazin and Italian Neorealism. Bloomsbury Publishing, 2011. 
 Moliterno, Gino. The A to Z of Italian Cinema. Scarecrow Press, 2009.

External links 
 

1946 films
Italian romantic musical films
1940s romantic musical films
1940s Italian-language films
Films directed by Pietro Francisci
Films set in Naples
Italian black-and-white films
1940s Italian films